Frontierland Shootin' Arcade is an attraction in Walt Disney World which simulates a shootout in Tombstone, Arizona, over Boot Hill in 1850. The gallery includes a jail, hotel, bank, and cemetery with targets which are animated when shot. There are a total of 97 targets in the shooting gallery.

History 
Originally, the guns shot lead pellets, but were replaced with infra-red light rifles during the summer of 1982, due to the maintenance costs of repainting the targets almost every night. This would use 2,000 gallons of paint a year.

Before September of 2021, it was an upcharge attraction and was only free during the park's Halloween festivities. Guests would previously have to pay $1 USD for 35 shots. However, it is now free for all parks guests to enjoy without separately purchasing admission to.

See also 
Similar attractions exist at: 

 Disneyland as the Frontierland Shootin' Exposition
 Disneyland Park (Paris) as the Rustler Roundup Shootin' Gallery
 Tokyo Disneyland as the Westernland Shootin' Gallery

References

External links
 Disneyland - Frontierland Shootin' Exposition
 Magic Kingdom - Frontierland Shootin' Arcade
 Tokyo Disneyland - Westernland Shootin' Gallery
 Disneyland Park (Paris) - Rustler Roundup Shootin' Gallery

Amusement park attractions introduced in 1971
Walt Disney Parks and Resorts attractions
Western (genre) amusement park attractions
Disneyland
Magic Kingdom
Disneyland Park (Paris)
Frontierland
1971 establishments in Florida